Communication is a 1971 album by Nelson Riddle and his orchestra. It was Riddle's first album for German record label MPS, followed by Changing Colors in 1973.

Reception

The Allmusic review by Jason Ankeny awarded the album four and a half stars and said the album is an "intoxicating mosaic of jazz, pop, and Latin elements...stands as a monumental testament to Riddle's consummate skill as an arranger and his almost alchemical faculty for creating a seamless whole from disparate parts".

Track listing
 "It's Your Turn" (Heinz Kiessling) - 3:17
 "Uptown Dance" (Claus Ogerman) - 3:43
 "Time and Space" (Erwin Lehn) - 2:11
 "Romantic Places" (Willi Fruth) - 3:30
 "Volcano's Daughter" (Rolf Hans Müller) - 3:18
 "Rachel" (Horst Jankowski) - 2:54
 "Born Happy" (Frank Pleyer) - 3:47
 "A Night of Love" (Franz Grothe) - 2:52
 "Dedication" (Georg Haentzschel) - 4:14
 "Greenwich Village" (Rolf Cardello) - 2:31

Personnel
Willi Fruth - producer
Claus Ogerman
Nelson Riddle - conductor, arrangements
Hubertus Mall - cover photo
Willem Makkee - digital remastering
Peter Kramper - engineer
Stefan Kassel - reissue art, series design
Matthias Kunnecke - reissue producer
Stephan Steigleder - series consultant

References

MPS Records albums
Nelson Riddle albums
Albums arranged by Nelson Riddle
1971 albums
Albums conducted by Nelson Riddle
Instrumental albums